At the Toyfair 2010 in New York City, Mattel revealed the WWE Legends action figure line. The figures are elite style and some also come with accessories. Series 1 arrived at stores in July 2010 with Series 2 right around the corner to be hitting the shelves in August 2010. Series 3, 4, 5 and 6 were announced at the 2010 San Diego ComicCon and followed in tow, being released to stores in September 2010, October 2010, November 2010 and December 2010 respectively.

There was much hype surrounding the line from collectors, most notably for WWE legend Ricky "The Dragon" Steamboat, who had not had a WWE (WWF) figure released of himself since his WWF Hasbro figure in 1992.

On May 11, 2020, Mattel, via Major Wrestling Podcast, revealed that Sting would not be a part of the seventh edition of WWE Legends action figures, despite pre-orders which were previously made by Target; the next day, it was revealed that the Sting WWE Legends action figure was pulled because he was no longer under contract with the WWE.

Complete collection

Series 1
Singles
Stone Cold Steve Austin with Austin 3:16 t-shirt
Ricky "The Dragon" Steamboat with Komodo dragon
Sgt. Slaughter with sunglasses & whistle
Dusty Rhodes with polka-dot shirt
Road Warrior Hawk with shoulder pad spikes
Road Warrior Animal with shoulder pad spikes

Toys "R" Us Exclusive 2-packs
The Bushwhackers (Luke Williams & Butch Miller) with bucket hats
The Iron Sheik with robe & Nikolai Volkoff with hat & jacket
"Rowdy" Roddy Piper with kilt and "Cowboy" Bob Orton with hat & vest

Series 2
Singles
"Ravishing" Rick Rude with robe
Terry Funk with branding iron from the Double Cross Ranch
Jimmy "Superfly" Snuka with robe
Kamala with Ugandan shield & mask
Jake "The Snake" Roberts with cobra snake
The Iron Sheik with robe

Series 3
Singles
The Rock with Layeth the Smackdown t-shirt
Mr. Perfect with towel & Intercontinental Championship belt
Brian Pillman with black vest
The British Bulldog with Hart Foundation jacket
Vader with white cape
"Hacksaw" Jim Duggan with American flag & 2x4

Series 4
Singles
The Ultimate Warrior with Intercontinental Championship belt
George "The Animal" Steele with Mine & sweater
"Mr. Wonderful" Paul Orndorff with robe
Hillbilly Jim with lucky horseshoe
Demolition Ax with leather spikes & mask
Demolition Smash with leather spikes & mask

Series 5
Singles
"Macho Man" Randy Savage with Macho Man shirt
Rick "The Model" Martel with Arrogance perfume
Akeem with hat
Bam Bam Bigelow with jacket

Series 6
Singles
The Ultimate Warrior with yellow World Heavyweight Championship
Eddie Guerrero with WWE Undisputed Championship
Kevin Von Erich with jacket
Kerry Von Erich with robe
Texas Tornado with jacket

Series 7
Singles

Series 7+ are being released as target exclusives

Razor Ramon with vest & chain
Bobby "The Brain" Heenan with weasel suit
Greg "The Hammer" Valentine with black attire, robe & shin guard
Greg "The Hammer" Valentine chase variant with yellow attire, robe & shin guard

Series 8
Singles
Paul Orndorff with robe
Eddie Guerrero
Ultimate Warrior with robe, mask and microphone
Jake Roberts with green attire, snake bag and snake
Jake Roberts with red attire snake bag and snake

Series 9
Singles
The Undertaker with hat, white mask & coat
"Million Dollar Man" Ted Dibiase with million dollar belt, and black suit
"Million Dollar Man" Ted Dibiase chase variant with million dollar belt, silver/puple suit
Nikolai Volkoff with hat and jacket
Tatanka with tomahawk

Series 10
Singles
Brutus Beefcake
Brutus Beefcake chase variant
"Diamond" Dallas Page
Big Van Vader
John Cena

Series 11
Singles
"Macho Man" Randy Savage
"Macho Man" Randy Savage chase variant
Scott Hall
Bam Bam Bigelow
Big John Studd

Series 12
Singles
Billy Gunn
"Rowdy" Roddy Piper
Kevin Nash
Junkyard Dog
Junkyard Dog chase variant

Series 13
Singles
Triple H
Jake the Snake
Jake the Snake chase variant
The Hurricane
"Cowboy" Bob Orton

Series 14
Singles
Edge
Edge chase variant
Mean Mark Callous
Chyna
Road Dogg

Series 15
Singles
Lex Luger
Lex Luger chase variant
Stacy Keibler
Kane
X-Pac

Series 16
Singles
Mighty Molly
Molly Holly chase variant
Bradshaw
Farooq
Rey Mysterio

Series 17
Singles
Dingo Warrior
AJ Styles
"The Heartbreak Kid" Shawn Michaels
Ken Shamrock
Ken Shamrock chase variant

Series 18
Singles
Paul E. Dangerously
Headshrinker Samu 
Samu Samoan Swat Team chase variant
Headshrinker Fatu
Fatu Samoan Swat Team chase variant
Hulk Hogan

Series 19
Singles
Kama Mustafa
D'Lo Brown 
D'Lo Brown chase variant
Brother Love
The Undertaker

Matty Collectors Exclusives
Singles
André the Giant with World Heavyweight Championship
Diamond Dallas Page with vest
King Kong Bundy with Bundy t-shirt
Arn Anderson with tag team championship belt
Tully Blanchard with tag team championship belt

2-packs
The Rockers (Shawn Michaels & and Marty Jannetty) with Rockers t-shirts

Ringside Collectibles Exclusives
"Macho King" Randy Savage with crown robe & scepter

See also
Wrestling Superstars
WWE action figures
WWF Hasbro action figures

References

External links

WWE
Action figures
Mattel